United Asset Management was an American holding company headquartered in Boston, Massachusetts that owned a number of financial-sector companies. It was founded in 1980 by Norton Reamer, who previously had served as the CEO of Putnam Investments. The company was the first major firm with a business model that consisted of purchasing a number of money management firms.

UAM's strategy was to purchase a variety of investment management firms, and then keep a portion of the firms' profits. They allowed each company to operate autonomously and did not close poorly performing units. More than half of UAM's assets were retirement funds. They used stock and cash to fund its acquisitions. They used First Boston as an investment bank to raise money for takeovers, using equity rather than convertible bonds. Some investors viewed the idea of purchasing stock in UAM as akin to an option on the New York Stock Exchange, where it was listed in 1987.

In 2000, UAM was purchased by Old Mutual for US$1.46 billion in cash. Old Mutual also assumed UAM net debt of around US$769 million. The company was then renamed Old Mutual Asset Management US. In March 2018, the company rebranded itself as Brightsphere Investment Group p.

See also
Affiliated Managers Group

References

External links
Old Mutual Asset Management US

Companies based in Massachusetts
Financial services companies established in 1980
Holding companies established in 1980
American companies established in 1980
Holding companies of the United States